Cikot (Serbian Cyrillic: Цикот) is a village in Šumadija and Western Serbia (Šumadija), in the municipality of Rekovac (Region of Levač), lying at , at the elevation of 270 m. According to the 2002 census, the village had 277 citizens.

External links
 Levac Online
 Article about Cikot
 Pictures from Cikot

Populated places in Pomoravlje District
Šumadija